nicknamed Renarena (れなれな), is a Japanese actress and model affiliated with Vithmic Co., Ltd.

Biography
Rena Takeda was born in Iwaki, Fukushima in 1997. In December 2013, she won a competition named "Seeking a second Kumicky" from among the 2,020 applicants.  She was an exclusive model in Popteen from February 2014 to April 2016. Since the June 2016 issue, she has been an exclusive model of Non-no. Her debut film in 2015 was Prison school where she played as one of the main cast.

Filmography

Films

TV series

Anime

Video Games

Variety Shows
Mezamashi TV: (2015-2016)

Commercials
Pocky: 2016

Bibliography

Magazines
 Popteen, Haruki Kadokawa Corporation 1980-, as an exclusive model from February 2014 to April 2016
Nylon Japan
Non-no, Shueisha 1971-, as an exclusive model since June 2016
Men's Non-No
Fine Boys
Men's Joker
Street Jack
Samurai ELO (Sanae Shobo)
CHOKi CHOKi
BLT (October 24, 2016 - Tokyo News Service) - December 2016 issue "Tavillena"
Weekly Young Jump (Shueisha)
2015 No. 13 February 26 extra large issue, No. 20 April 16 release issue, No. 25, No. 30, No. 41
2016 No. 6-7 merger issue, no. 18, no. 37-38 merger issue
2018 No. 36-37 merger issue
2019 No. 11 appearance with Sarii Ikegami
Weekly Shōnen Sunday (August 12, 2015; October 28, 2015, Shogakugan) No. 35 and 46 2016 - Both covers
Weekly Shōnen Magazine (Kodansha)
September 16, 2015 No. 42; September 5, 2018 No. 40; 2019 No. 1 - December 5, 2018
March 6, 2019 No.14; November 20, 2019 No. 51
Soccer Game King (April 24, 2015, From One) - June 2015 cover
Weekly Playboy (October 5, 2015, Shueisha) - October 19, 2015 Issue No. 43

Photo Album
 Twintail to Kikanjū (March 7, 2014, Famima Dot Com) 
 Carp Girl (August 29, 2014, MyNavi) 
 Short (March 31, 2016, Shueisha)

References

External links

 
  (September 7, 2018 to Present)
  (to September 7, 2018)
  (December 11, 2014 to Present)
  (October 16, 2013 to December 10, 2014, July 27, 2020 to Present)
 
 

1997 births
Living people
Actors from Fukushima Prefecture
21st-century Japanese actresses
Japanese female models
Japanese gravure models
Japanese television personalities
Models from Fukushima Prefecture